Seattle Youth Symphony Orchestras (SYSO) is the largest youth symphony organization and youth orchestra training program in the United States, as well as the eighth oldest.

Programs

SYSO-in-the-Schools supports public school instrumental music programs by providing instruction in 25 Seattle-area public schools serving over 600 students annually.

Marrowstone Summer Festivals provide learning for over 500 students age 7 to 25 years each summer.

The Academic-Year Orchestra Program serves over 470 students through four full orchestras and one string orchestra.  
The Symphonette Orchestra serves as an arena for younger musicians to gain valuable performance experience. 
The next level orchestra is the Debut Symphony Orchestra, which is the largest orchestra in the organization's academic year program. 
The next orchestra is Junior Symphony Orchestra, which performs major works from the symphonic repertoire.  The 
Seattle Youth Symphony Orchestra, composed of young musicians in the Puget Sound region, is SYSO's flagship orchestra and one of the leading youth orchestras in the United States. The orchestra performs three regular season concerts in Benaroya Hall, home of the Seattle Symphony, and regularly partners with the Pacific Northwest Ballet, the Seattle Opera, regional Broadway Musical Theater organizations, local choruses and internationally acclaimed guest artists and conductors. Finally, the Prelude String Orchestra, the lowest level, founded in 2016, is composed of very young musicians.

SYSO also offers three summer music programs. The Marrowstone Music Festival, hosted by Western Washington University in Bellingham, serves around 185 high school and college aged students a year with a two-week intensive residential summer program.  Faculty members at Marrowstone have included Dale Clevenger and Glenn Dicterow.  Two sessions of Marrowstone in the City (MITC) are held in suburbs that surround Seattle, and serve over 330 younger players.

SYSO works with local schools through the Endangered Instruments Program, started by Walter Cole, a project that exposes middle school students to less commonly played instruments like the oboe, bassoon, viola, double bass and French horn. The first of its kind in the United States, the program has been emulated in many other places, including New York City, Fort Lauderdale, Florida and Vancouver, B.C.  EIP partners with 13 Seattle-area public schools to serve over 170 students a year.

Through all of its programs, Seattle Youth Symphony Orchestras serves over 1,100 young musicians each year.  Its concerts reach over 14,000, and are replayed over KING-FM to audiences in excess of 200,000.

In November 2008, the Seattle Youth Symphony Orchestras received a grant of $500,000 from the Wallace foundation.

History
The Seattle Youth Symphony Orchestra, the organization's oldest orchestra, was founded by the Music and Art Foundation in 1942, and its first conductor was Francis Aranyi. He was an internationally famous violinist who performed with many of the greatest orchestras in Europe, and knew such leading composers as Béla Bartók and Arnold Schoenberg. In 1941 Aranyi came to Seattle as concertmaster of the Seattle Symphony, a position he retained for one season.  Although his arrival was concurrent with the hiring of Sir Thomas Beecham as conductor, Aranyi was hired separately and was not chosen for the position by the conductor. During Aranyi's direction of the Youth Symphony, he built up the group to an orchestra that was nationally recognized.  Following establishment of the Little Symphony (now the Seattle Debut Symphony) in 1946, this training orchestra was advertised as "a reserve group for promotion to the major Youth Symphony," and traced its roots to a Preparatory Ensemble which had been established in 1943.  The Little Symphony presented its first public concert on June 7, 1947. Thomas Rodrique became its conductor in 1950.  Francis Aranyi and Thomas Rodrique were the musical staff of the Youth Symphony Orchestra for the Pacific Northwest, as the organization was then called, until 1959.

For its first two years, it was called the Youth Symphony Orchestra of Seattle.  From 1944 to 1963, it was the Youth Symphony Orchestra of the Pacific Northwest.  Vilem Sokol led the orchestra for 28 years (1960-1988), and it was under him that the YSO became the fourth orchestra in the United States to perform Gustav Mahler's Tenth Symphony.  After the London Symphony Orchestra gave its premiere, the Philadelphia Orchestra, the Chicago Symphony Orchestra, and the San Francisco Symphony   had been the only orchestras in the world to have performed the work.  Under conductor Sokol, the Seattle Youth Symphony Orchestra made two recordings of Mahler's Tenth Symphony in its entirety.

After Sokol's departure in 1988, the symphony was led by conductors Ruben Gurevich (1988–93) and Jonathan Shames (1994-2001).

SYSO's Music Director was Dr. Stephen Rogers Radcliffe from 2006 to 2018.  In 2019, Juan Felipe Molano became conductor.

Notes and references

American youth orchestras
Performing arts in Washington (state)
1942 establishments in Washington (state)
Musical groups established in 1942
Youth organizations based in Washington (state)
Musical groups from Seattle